Texas Cannabis Collective is a cannabis rights activism group founded in 2016 in the U.S. state of Texas. , it was headed by Austin Zamhariri, also called Daryoush Austin Zamhariri, a resident of the Fort Worth area.

References

Sources

External links

2016 establishments in Texas
Cannabis law reform organizations based in the United States
Organizations established in 2016